Preuss's weaver (Ploceus preussi) is a species of bird in the family Ploceidae, which is native to the African tropics.

Range
It is found in Cameroon, Central African Republic, Republic of the Congo, DRC, Ivory Coast, Equatorial Guinea, Gabon, Ghana, Guinea, Liberia, and Sierra Leone.

References

External links
 Preuss's weaver -  Species text in Weaver Watch.

Preuss's weaver
Birds of Central Africa
Birds of West Africa
Preuss's weaver
Taxonomy articles created by Polbot